Javesella is a genus of delphacid planthoppers in the family Delphacidae. There are at least 20 described species in Javesella.

Species
These 24 species belong to the genus Javesella.

References

Further reading

 
 
 
 
 
 
 
 
 
 
 
 
 
 

Auchenorrhyncha genera
Delphacini